Xsigo Systems was an information technology and hardware company based in San Jose, California, US.
It provided data center network and I/O virtualization software and hardware to companies and enterprises.

Company History
Xsigo Systems was founded in August 2004 by three brothers: Ashok Krishnamurthi, R.K. Anand, and S.K. Vinod.  and Shreyas Shah.  The privately held company was based in San Jose, CA and funded by Kleiner Perkins, Khosla Ventures, North Bridge Venture Partners, and Greylock Partners. Ashok Krishnamurthi served as vice-chairman of the company. Krishnamurthi previously held the positions of Vice President and General Manager of the infrastructure product line at Juniper Networks, prior to Xsigo Systems. Lloyd Carney served as the chief executive officer of the company. Carney was General Manager of IBM's Netcool Division, which acquired Micromuse where Carney had been chairman and CEO. Prior to Micromuse, Carney was COO at Juniper Networks and head of three divisions at Nortel Networks, including the Core IP Division, the Wireless Internet Division and the Enterprise Data Divisions.

US Patent #7937447 Granted May 3, 2011

Xsigo Systems was purchased by Oracle Corporation. The deal was announced at the end of July, 2012 and finalized on September 12, 2012.

Several companies providers, including Microsoft and Oracle, have mentioned Xsigo Systems.

Products and services

Xsigo Systems' product, the I/O Director, is a hardware and software device that consolidates data center infrastructure and streamlines server I/O management. Using the Xsigo I/O Director, users provision I/O resources on live servers, without disrupting network and storage configurations, and without physically entering the data center. Xsigo's I/O virtualization solution replaces a server's multiple Ethernet and Fibre Channel interfaces with a single high-speed Ethernet or InfiniBand link. Multiple virtual Ethernet interfaces (vNICs) and virtual Fibre Channel interfaces (vHBAs) communicate over this link. Virtual interfaces are established using Xsigo's virtualization hardware and Xsigo's host drivers. These virtual I/O resources appear to the server's applications like their traditional I/O card-based counterparts but unlike traditional I/O resources, vNICs and vHBAs can be created as needed and do not require the server to be opened or rebooted.

Xsigo awards and achievements include The Wall Street Journal Technology Innovation Award in the Network / Internet Technologies category,  being named Storage Magazine's Product of the Year in the networking equipment category; also being identified by Byte and Switch as a Top 10 Storage Startup to Watch; also being named by Virtualization Review Magazine as Take Five: Innovative Vendor; and being identified by eWeek as a Top 10 Disruptive New Storage Technology. Xsigo Systems' VP780 I/O Director was also nominated for SYS-CON's Virtualization Journal Readers' Choice and Awards for Best Network Virtualization.

References

External links
 
 

Technology companies established in 2004
Networking companies of the United States
Networking hardware companies
Companies based in California
Oracle acquisitions